Kosmos 291 ( meaning Cosmos 291), was a satellite which was used as a target for tests of anti-satellite weapons. It was launched by the Soviet Union in September 1969 as part of the Istrebitel Sputnikov programme.

Launch 
It was launched aboard a Tsyklon carrier rocket, from the Baikonur Cosmodrome. The launch occurred at 5:44:00 UTC on 06 September 1969. Shortly after launch, there was a booster failure which resulted in the loss of the spacecraft.

See also

 1969 in spaceflight

References

1969 in spaceflight
1969 in the Soviet Union
Intentionally destroyed artificial satellites
Kosmos satellites
Spacecraft launched in 1969